Peter Fassbender (born 1946) is a Canadian politician, who was elected to the Legislative Assembly of British Columbia in the 2013 provincial election after a career at the municipal level. He was elected to represent the electoral district of Surrey-Fleetwood as a member of the British Columbia Liberal Party. He was appointed by Premier Christy Clark as Minister of Education in June 2013, then Minister of Community, Sport and Cultural Development & Minister Responsible for TransLink in July 2015.

Early profession
Fassbender was born in Germany and emigrated to Canada with his parents in 1952. Since then, he has lived his whole life in Surrey, Aldergrove or Langley. He graduated from Queen Elizabeth High School in Surrey and attended the National Broadcasting School in Vancouver. He got a film librarian job at CHAN Television (now Global) and moved up the ranks to cameraman, and then producer and director. He worked for the advertising agency James Lovick in the early 1970s and eventually became a partner of Frank Palmer at the national firm DDB Canada (formerly Palmer Jarvis). A major focus of his private sector career focused on social marketing campaigns including smoking cessation projects for Health Canada and international marketing activities for Industry Canada. In 1996 and 1997 he was reported to have done volunteer public relations work for the evangelical men's organization Promise Keepers.
He is a distant cousin of actor Michael Fassbender.

Politics
After a failed run at a Social Credit nomination, Fassbender served a four-year term (1975 to 1979) during some turbulent years on the Langley school board. During that time, the board pursued a 'back-to-basics' approach that considered the restoration of corporal punishment and banning the Go Ask Alice novel. Fassbender says his approach to education has changed since the 1970s.

Fassbender was elected for the first time to the city council of Langley in 2002, and then as mayor in the 2005, 2008 and 2011 civic elections. He advocated for the growing communities south of the Fraser River as co-chair of the municipal advisory council for Fraser Health and as vice-chair of TransLink's mayors council.

In November 2012, the provincial government appointed Fassbender as chair of the board for the BC Pavilion Corporation, which operates BC Place Stadium and the Vancouver Convention Centre. In addition to dealing with major renovations, the position also dealt with transparency criticism from journalist Bob Mackin.
In the 2013 provincial election, he defeated three-term NDP MLA Jagrup Brar and took leave from his mayoral position.

As Minister of Education, one of his priorities was to seek a 10-year labour agreement with the British Columbia Teachers' Federation.

In addition to his ministerial duties, Fassbender sat on the Cabinet Committee on Secure Tomorrow.

In the 2017 provincial election, he lost his re-election as MLA to Jagrup Brar.

In 2018, he ran for his former position as mayor of the City of Langley. He was narrowly defeated, losing to Val van den Broek by around 200 votes.

Electoral record

References

1946 births
Living people
Advertising directors
British Columbia Liberal Party MLAs
Canadian librarians
Canadian television directors
Canadian television producers
Education ministers of British Columbia
West German emigrants to Canada
British Columbia municipal councillors
Mayors of places in British Columbia
People from Langley, British Columbia (city)
Members of the Executive Council of British Columbia
People from Surrey, British Columbia
20th-century Canadian politicians
21st-century Canadian politicians